The 1980–81 Maryland Terrapins men's basketball team represented the University of Maryland as a member of the Atlantic Coast Conference during the 1980–81 men's college basketball season. The team was led by head coach Lefty Driesell and played their home games at Cole Field House in College Park, Maryland. The Terrapins finished the season with a 21–10 overall record (8–6 ACC), and reached the second round of the NCAA tournament before losing to No. 3 seed and eventual National champion Indiana.

Roster

Schedule

|-
!colspan=9 style=| Regular season

|-
!colspan=9 style=|

|-
!colspan=9 style=|

Rankings

References

Maryland Terrapins men's basketball seasons
Maryland
Maryland
Maryland
Maryland